Fujisaki may refer to:

Fujisaki (surname)
Fujisaki, Aomori, a town in Minamitsugaru District, Aomori Prefecture, Japan
Fujisaki Station (disambiguation), multiple railway stations in Japan

See also
Fujisaki Hachiman-gū, a Shinto shrine in  Chūō-ku, Kumamoto, Japan